FK or fk may refer to:

In arts and entertainment:
 Flyer Killer, fictional automated robots in the Terminator film franchise.
 Fox Kids, a former American children's television programming block.
 Funky Kong, a video game character.

Place:
 FK postcode area, UK, centred on Falkirk in Scotland.
 Falkland Islands, FIPS PUB 10-4 territory code and ISO 3166 digram
.fk, country code top-level domain (ccTLD) for the Falkland Islands.

Other uses:
 First aid kit
 First Corridor rail coach
 Football Club, abbreviated "FK" in Slavic and Balkan countries
 Foreign key, in database design
 Forward kinematics, in robotics and animation, the use of kinematic equations to find the position of an articulated object
 Fuck, an English-language vulgarity
 Africa West Airlines (IATA airline designator FK)
 Finders Keepers
 kinetic friction, in physics, mechanics